Simon Dickson (born 25 February 1982) is a British former professional tennis player.

Dickson, a top-10 junior who has beaten Roger Federer, featured in the men's doubles main draw of the 1999 Wimbledon Championships. He and Lee Childs lost in the first round to the Bryan brothers, Bob and Mike.

References

External links
 
 

1982 births
Living people
British male tennis players